Hendryx is a surname. Notable people with the surname include:

 James Hendryx (1880-1963), American author of western fiction
 John Hendryx (born 19?), American theologian (adherent of monergism)
 Nona Hendryx (born 1944), American singer and actress, cousin of Jimi Hendrix
 Tim Hendryx (1891–1957), American baseball player

See also 

 Jimi Hendrix
 Hendric
 Hendrick (disambiguation)
 Hendricks (disambiguation)
 Hendrickx
 Hendrik (disambiguation)
 Hendriks
 Hendrikx
 Hendrix (disambiguation)
 Henrik
 Henry (disambiguation)
 Henryk (given name)